George Hastings (March 13, 1807 – August 29, 1866) was an American lawyer, jurist, and politician who served one term as a U.S. Representative from New York from 1853 to 1855.

Biography 
Hastings was born in Clinton, New York and attended the public schools. He graduated in law in 1826 from Hamilton College in Clinton, New York.
In 1830 he was admitted to the bar and commenced practice in Mount Morris, Livingston County, New York.

Family 
Hastings married Mary H. Seymour in 1832 and in 1847, two years after being widowed, he married again this time to Chloe A. Parmele.  He served as a district attorney from 1839 to 1848.

Congress 
Hastings was elected as a Democrat to the Thirty-third Congress (March 4, 1853 – March 3, 1855).

Later career and death 
Hastings was elected judge of the county court of Livingston County and served from November 1855 until his death in Mount Morris, New York on August 29, 1866. He was interred in the city cemetery.

References

External links
 Descendants of Thomas Hastings website

1807 births
1866 deaths
People from Clinton, Oneida County, New York
People from Mount Morris, New York
New York (state) lawyers
New York (state) state court judges
Hamilton College (New York) alumni
Democratic Party members of the United States House of Representatives from New York (state)
19th-century American politicians
19th-century American judges
19th-century American lawyers